Upton with Fishley is a civil parish in the English county of Norfolk, consisting of the former parishes of Upton and Fishley.
For the purposes of local government, it falls within the district of Broadland.

Notes

External links

Civil parishes in Norfolk
Broadland